Prayer camps are religious institutions for as an alternative for hospitals for a variety of ailments in Ghana, and Togo. Methods such as being chained up or fasting are used.

Beliefs 
Ghana is said to be "the most religious society in the world" (Religion in Ghana), with 96% of the population identifying with a particular spiritual belief. Mental illness is seen as caused by curses or demons. The only perceived solution to this problem is through spiritual healing, like prayer, with only minimal medical help being applied, such as through medication being given to patients.

A 2016 Yale University study showed that both prayer camp prophets and staff and psychiatric hospital mental health professionals show interest at the idea of collaboration. Specifically, prayer camp staff are interested in help with the provision and use of medication, as well as improving the hygiene and infrastructure of prayer camps. However, prayer camp staff are highly opposed to medical explanations of mental illness, instead preferring spiritual and traditional explanations, while mental health and medical staff are concerned with the practice of extended chainings and fastings. Furthermore, despite the importance of long-term medication use in patient recovery, prayer camp staff only endorse its use over short periods.

See also
 Spirit children, disabled children in Ghana
 Witch camp, Ghana 
 Health in Ghana
 Disability in Ghana

References

Society of Ghana
Healthcare in Ghana
Religion in Ghana
African witchcraft